Luke Stephen Maxwell (born 6 July 1997) is an English former footballer who played as a midfielder.

Maxwell began his career with Kidderminster Harriers, and was loaned back to that club after signing for Birmingham City of the Championship in January 2016. He spent time on loan at League Two club Grimsby Town, for whom he made his debut in the Football League, and at Gateshead and Solihull Moors of the National League, before joining the latter permanently in January 2019. In 2019–20, he spent time on loan at National League North club Gloucester City before returning to Kidderminster Harriers for the 2020–21 season. He left Kidderminster Harriers at the end of the 2020-21 season to pursue a career outside of football.

Club career

Early life and career
Maxwell was born in Kidderminster, Worcestershire, where he attended Baxter College. He scored in the final as his under-15 school team won the 2012 Worcestershire Schools County Cup final, a performance that earned them the District Council's award for school team of the year. He began his football career in the academy system at his local club, Kidderminster Harriers, as part of which he completed a BTEC Extended Diploma in Sport at Stourbridge College. He was a member of the Kidderminster under-18 team that reached the third round of the 2014–15 FA Youth Cup, in which they lost 2–1 to Championship club Blackpool's youngsters, and signed his first contract with the club in December 2014. Maxwell made his first-team debut later that month, aged , in the starting eleven for a 1–0 defeat at home to Southport in the Conference. He went on to make a further seven league appearances that season, and also scored in the final of the Worcestershire Senior Cup to help Kidderminster beat Worcester City 2–1.

He became a regular in Kidderminster's first team in 2015–16, and made 22 league appearances in the first half of the season. In January 2016, he signed a three-and-a-half-year contract with Championship club Birmingham City for a fee of £75,000, to be paid in two instalments. As part of the deal, he returned to Kidderminster on a youth loan for the remainder of the season, and made a further 15 appearances, scoring twicefor his first senior goal, "he curled a finely-struck effort" to open the scoring in a 3–2 win against Eastleighas his team were unable to avoid relegation. Maxwell's performances for Kidderminster over the season earned him the Players' Player of the Season award. Maxwell returned to Birmingham City in time to be part of the Birmingham reserve team that lost the 2016 Birmingham Senior Cup final to National League North champions Solihull Moors.

Football League debut
Maxwell appeared for Birmingham's first team in 2016 pre-season, and by the new year was the under-23 team's joint-highest appearance maker, but had not played a competitive first-team match. On 27 January 2017, he joined League Two club Grimsby Town on loan to the end of the season. At the time, he was receiving treatment for a groin injury at his parent club, so did not make his Football League debut until 18 February, as an 83rd-minute substitute in a 3–0 win against Mansfield Town. On 4 May 2017, Maxwell returned to Birmingham prior to the final game of the season from his loan spell at Grimsby.

More loans
Maxwell joined National League club Gateshead on a three-month loan on 15 September 2017. He finished the spell with eleven appearances, eight in the league and three in the FA Cup.

He joined another National League club, Solihull Moors, in July 2018 on loan until 5 January 2019. He was a first-team regular for the full length of his loan spell, making 23 National League appearances and a further 5 in cup competitions.

Solihull Moors
When the loan expired, Maxwell signed for Solihull Moors on an 18-month contract with an option of a further year. He made 10 more National League appearances in what remained of the season, and was named Young Player of the Year as Moors finished as National League runners-up.

Maxwell missed the first half of the 2019–20 season with a knee injury. He joined National League North club Gloucester City on 31 December 2019 on loan for a month, made his debut the following day in the starting eleven for a 2–1 win at home to Leamington, and made four more appearances before being recalled by his parent club three days before the loan spell was due to end. He made two substitute appearances before the National League season was suspended and then terminated early because of the COVID-19 pandemic, and was released when his contract expired.

Return to Kidderminster
In July 2020, Maxwell rejoined Kiddermnster Harriers on a one-year contract.

Honours
Solihull Moors
 National League runners-up: 2018–19
Individual
Solihull Moors Young Player of the Season: 2018-19

Club statistics

References

External links

1997 births
Living people
Sportspeople from Kidderminster
English footballers
Association football midfielders
Kidderminster Harriers F.C. players
Birmingham City F.C. players
Grimsby Town F.C. players
Gateshead F.C. players
Solihull Moors F.C. players
Gloucester City A.F.C. players
National League (English football) players
English Football League players